Per Jonsson (born 21 March 1966 in Stockholm, Sweden) is a former speedway rider who won the  Speedway World Championship in 1990, and finished runner-up in 1992.

Career
In 1985, his second season with the Reading Racers, the team won six major trophies. In 1993, he won the World Pairs Championship with Tony Rickardsson and reserve Henrik Gustafsson, and also won the British League Riders' Championship. His career was cut short when a crash during a league meeting in Poland in 1994 left him using a wheelchair for the rest of his life. In recognition of his contribution to the city of Toruń, in April 2010 one of the streets was named after him.

Per Jonsson became the first rider in history to win both the World and World Under-21 Championships. He won the Under-21 title in 1985 at Abensberg, Bavaria, West Germany when the title was still known as the European Speedway Under 21 Championship*. He then added to this with his 1990 World Championship win at the Odsal Stadium in Bradford, England.

Per Jonsson's first appearance in a World Final was in 1987 at Amsterdam's Olympic Stadium. The final was held over two days and the 22-year-old finished 5th on both days and was classed as 5th overall. He qualified for the 1988 World Final at Vojens in Denmark and equalled his 1987 result by finishing in 5th place. Also in 1988, Jonsson won the famed Golden Helmet of Pardubice in Czechoslovakia, the oldest speedway race in the world. Jonsson became the first Swedish winner of the Golden Helmet since Leif Enecrona in 1968.

Jonsson represented Sweden in the World Pairs Championship, reaching the Final each year from 1988 until 1993. He finished second with Jimmy Nilsen in 1989 in Leszno, Poland, second again Nilsen and Henrik Gustafsson in 1991 in Poznań, Poland, third with Gustafsson and Tony Rickardsson in 1992 in Lonigo, Italy, before winning the last World Pairs Championship with Rickardsson and Gustafsson in 1993 in Vojens.

He also represented Sweden in the World Team Cup on seven occasions between 1985 and 1993. With Jonsson as part of the team, Sweden finished 4th in 1985 and 1986, 3rd in 1988 and 1989, 2nd in 1991 and 1992 and 3rd in 1993. After both teams had tied on 22 points, Jonsson defeated England's number 1 rider Kelvin Tatum in a runoff for 3rd in the 1988 WTC Final at the Veterans Memorial Stadium in Long Beach, USA, to ensure Sweden's place in the 1989 Final in Bradford. Tatum won the start and led Jonsson for 2 laps before the Swede moved underneath to give his team a hard-fought 3rd place.

Despite riding for Sweden in the World Pairs and Team Cup competitions, Jonsson missed the 1989 British League season, preferring instead to enjoy the joys of fatherhood, though he did ride in Sweden for Elitserien club Stockholm United, winning the Swedish League Championship. He came back to international speedway in 1990, qualifying for his third World Final by finishing 2nd in both the Scandinavian and Intercontinental Finals, and then went one better in Bradford becoming Sweden's first Speedway World Champion since Anders Michanek won in 1974. Then with his British team the Reading Racers (who included Australian rider Todd Wiltshire who had finished 3rd behind Jonsson in the World Final), Per won both the 1990 British League Championship and the British League Knockout Cup.

Following this, Jonsson captained the Swedish team on a short tour of Australia in January 1991, the first time since 1971/72 that a Swedish speedway team had toured down under. Sweden, whose lineup was Jonsson, Henrik Gustafsson, Jimmy Nilsen, Tony Rickardsson, Conny Ivarsson, Erik Stenlund and Peter Nahlin defeated the Phil Crump captained Aussies (who fielded 14 riders over the series) 3–2 in the five match series with Jonsson topping the averages for both teams with 16.4 per test. The Swede's proved a popular draw card in Australia.

Jonsson failed to place in the 1991 World Final at the Ullevi Stadium in Göteborg, finishing in 9th place while fellow Swede's Tony Rickardsson and Jimmy Nilsen finished in 2nd and 5th respectively. His 1992 World Final got off to a bad start in Wrocław, Poland, when he failed to score in his first ride. He then came back to win three of his last four rides to finish in a clear 2nd place behind England's Gary Havelock.

* The European Under 21 Championship was renamed the World Under 21 Championship in 1988. All winners of the European title before 1988 are generally classed as World Under-21 Champions

World final appearances

Individual World Championship
 1987 –  Amsterdam, Olympic Stadium – 5th – 22pts
 1988 –  Vojens, Speedway Center – 5th – 9pts
 1990 –  Bradford, Odsal Stadium – Winner – 13pts+3pts
 1991 –  Göteborg, Ullevi – 9th – 7pts
 1992 –  Wrocław, Olympic Stadium – 2nd – 11pts
 1993 –  Pocking, Rottalstadion – 9th – 7pts

World Pairs Championship
 1985 –  Rybnik, Rybnik Municipal Stadium (with Jan Andersson) – 5th – 14pts (4)
 1988 –  Bradford, Odsal Stadium (with Jimmy Nilsen) – 5th – 29pts (12)
 1989 –  Leszno, Alfred Smoczyk Stadium (with Jimmy Nilsen) – 2nd – 44pts (21)
 1990 –  Landshut, Ellermühle Stadium (with Jimmy Nilsen) – 4th – 33pts (16)
 1991 –  Poznań, Olimpia Poznań Stadium (with Henrik Gustafsson / Jimmy Nilsen) – 2nd – 24pts (7)
 1992 –  Lonigo, Pista Speedway (with Henrik Gustafsson / Tony Rickardsson) – 3rd – 22pts (14)
 1993 –  Vojens, Speedway Center (with Tony Rickardsson / Henrik Gustafsson) – Winner – 26pts (5)

World Team Cup
 1985 –  Long Beach, Veterans Memorial Stadium (with Jan Andersson / Jimmy Nilsen / Tommy Nilsson / Pierre Brannefors) – 4th – 10pts (0)
 1986 –  Göteborg, Ullevi,  Vojens, Speedway Center and  Bradford, Odsal Stadium (with Jan Andersson / Jimmy Nilsen / Tommy Nilsson / Erik Stenlund / Tony Olsson) – 4th – 73pts (21)
 1988 –  Long Beach, Veterans Memorial Stadium (with Conny Ivarsson / Tony Olsson / Jimmy Nilsen / Henrik Gustafsson) – 3rd – 22+3pts (9+3)
 1989 –  Bradford, Odsal Stadium (with Mikael Blixt / Tony Olsson / Erik Stenlund / Jimmy Nilsen) – 3rd – 30pts (8)
 1991 –  Vojens, Speedway Center (with Tony Rickardsson / Henrik Gustafsson / Jimmy Nilsen / Peter Nahlin) – 2nd – 30pts (9)
 1992 –  Kumla, Kumla Speedway (with Tony Rickardsson / Henrik Gustafsson / Jimmy Nilsen / Peter Nahlin) – 2nd – 33pts (11)
 1993 –  Coventry, Brandon Stadium (with Peter Karlsson / Henrik Gustafsson / Tony Rickardsson / Peter Nahlin) – 3rd – 28pts (7)

Individual Under-21 World Championship
 1985 –  , Abensberg, Motorstadion – Winner – 15pts

Family
He son Dennis Jonsson rode for Lakeside Hammers in the 2016 Elite League but retired from speedway following a serious accident when riding for Marsana in Sweden.

External links
Reading Racers website

References

1966 births
Living people
Swedish speedway riders
Individual Speedway World Champions
Reading Racers riders
Sportspeople from Stockholm